Cainscross is a suburban town and  civil parish in Gloucestershire, England, bordering the town of Stroud and forming part of the Stroud urban area.  The parish includes the communities of Ebley, Cashes Green and Cainscross, and part of Dudbridge.

The population of the civil parish was 6,680 (in 2001) of which 14.6% are in the 5–14 age group. The area is predominantly white (98.4%) with a high proportion of lone parent households with dependent children in comparison to the Stroud and county averages. 18.8% of the household rent from a social landlord, 6.2% of household are claiming housing benefit, and 22.4% of households have no car – again all much higher than the county or Stroud profiles. Lone pensioner households are also high, at 18.2%, with smaller proportions of people providing unpaid care, and higher social service referrals for the over-75s than elsewhere.

As a relatively prosperous parish within Gloucestershire, there are low levels of burglary, theft of motor vehicles; the numbers of serious and fatal road traffic accidents compared to the county average. The percentage of young offenders resident in the area and of children with low scores at key stages 1–3, are also below the Stroud and county averages.

The Town Council is hoping to improve provision of community and youth facilities; these, along with levels of open space, were identified in the 2006 Parish Plan as key issues along with library, post office and evening bus services. The Town Council is looking to improve their play areas and make them inclusive and at present are raising funds to re-vamp Victory Park Play area.

Cainscross is well served with local amenities, including a post office and a medium-sized co-operative supermarket. It is well connected to Stroud (only a 25-minute walk away) with frequent bus services to Stonehouse, Gloucester and Cheltenham. The Stroudwater Canal is easily accessible to the south, as is Selsley Common. Stroud town centre lies 1.6 miles (2.5 km) to the east.

Governance
An electoral ward in the same name exists. Much of this ward is in the parish of Cainscross but the ward stretches to Randwick. The total ward population taken at the 2011 census was 7,316.

Notable people
The pioneer photographer, William Vick was a schoolmaster here in the 1850s-1860s, before subsequently becoming a photographer in Ipswich.

References

External links

Parish council website

Villages in Gloucestershire
Stroud District
Civil parishes in Gloucestershire